Michael John Miller (born 22 April 1951) is a Scottish professional golfer.

Miller was born in Lenzie, East Dunbartonshire, near Glasgow. He turned professional in 1978 at a relatively late age, and was the European Tour's Sir Henry Cotton Rookie of the Year in 1979. That year he lost a playoff to Mark James at the Welsh Golf Classic. He never came closer than that to winning a European Tour event, though he finished second in the 1983 Kronenbourg Open. His best ranking on the European Tour Order of Merit was forty-seventh in 1981. However he has won several professional tournaments, including one each on the Challenge Tour and the European Seniors Tour, which he joined in 2001.

Professional wins (8)

Challenge Tour wins (1)

Challenge Tour playoff record (1–0)

Other wins (5)
1981 Sierra Leone Open
1982 Sierra Leone Open
1986 Dunbar Professional Championship
1990 Daily Express Scottish National Pro-am
1998 Sunderland of Scotland Masters

European Senior Tour wins (1)

Other senior wins (1)
2001 Belleisle Hotels Giles insurance Scottish PGA Seniors Championship

Playoff record
European Tour playoff record (0–1)

Results in major championships

Note: Miller only played in The Open Championship.

CUT = missed the half-way cut
"T" = tied

Team appearances
Europcar Cup (representing Scotland): 1988

External links

Scottish male golfers
European Tour golfers
European Senior Tour golfers
Sportspeople from Lenzie
People from Torrance, East Dunbartonshire
1951 births
Living people